আমার পৃথিবী is the debut album by Bangladeshi rock band Black. It was released in 2002, the album cemented Black as a household name in Bangladesh. After releasing "চেনা দুঃখ" through the G-Series mixed album ছাড়পত্র in 2001 the band began working on a full-scale album at Isha Khan Duray and Imran Ahmed Chowdhury Mobin's studio Sound Garden. The album contains mostly songs written by the band during the earliest stages of their formation.

Track listing

Personnel 

 Zobayer Hossain Emon - writer
 Jon Kabir - vocals, guitar
 Mushfeque Jahan - lead guitar
 Mahmudul Karim Miraz - bass
 Mehmood Tony - drum kit
 Tahsan Rahman Khan - vocals, keyboard

Guest musicians 
 Elita Karim - Vocals on track 11

Production 

 Recorded By - Imran Ahmed Choudury Mobin and Isha Khan Duray
 Recorded At - Sound Garden
 Mixed and Mastered By - Isha Khan Duray
 Khademul Insan - Album Art
 Humayun Kabir - Graphics

2002 debut albums
Black (Bangladeshi band) albums